Michalovice is a castle near the Jizera river, about  northwest of the town of Mladá Boleslav, in Central Bohemia, Czech Republic.

The ruins of the early Gothic Michalovice castle stands on the right bank of the Jizera river. It was built by members of the Markvartice family during the last quarter of the 13th century to replace an earlier manor house. It was left to decay already in the 15th century. In the 19th century the ruins of the castle were sacked by treasure hunters, and now only the look-out tower remains.

The robust cylindrical leaning tower is the reason the castle has often been called the tub of Michalovice.

See also
 List of castles in the Central Bohemian Region

References

Castles in the Central Bohemian Region
Buildings and structures in Mladá Boleslav